Shawn Harrison (born December 28, 1973) is an American actor best known for his role as Waldo Faldo, the dim-witted but lovable chef-in-training on the ABC sitcom Family Matters from 1990 to 1996.

Before sixth grade, he appeared in seven commercials such as Fruity Pebbles and Burger King. In 1986, Harrison made an appearance in the Kidsongs video "I'd Like to Teach the World to Sing" in the role of Mike. His mother died when he was 17.

Harrison has also made occasional appearances as the hairstylist Peaches on the UPN sitcom Girlfriends, and made several guest appearances on other series prior to that, including Moesha.

He provided the voice of Timber Wolf on the animated series Legion of Super Heroes, which premiered in fall 2006. He was also in an episode of Punky Brewster. He also played William K in two episodes The Ms. Pat Show.

Filmography

Film

Television

References

External links

1973 births
African-American male actors
American male child actors
American male film actors
American male television actors
American male voice actors
Living people
Male actors from Los Angeles
21st-century African-American people
20th-century African-American people